The Rivière Monsieur is a river of Martinique. It flows into the Caribbean Sea in Fort-de-France.

See also
List of rivers of Martinique

References

Rivers of Martinique
Rivers of France